Ceri Hughes (born 26 February 1971) is a Welsh former footballer who played as a midfielder. His clubs included Luton Town, for which he played for eight years, Wimbledon (where he scored once against Barnsley), Portsmouth (where he scored on his debut against Stockport County) and, lastly, Cardiff City where he made no first team appearances. He won eight caps for the Welsh national team, without scoring.

References

External links

1971 births
Living people
Welsh footballers
Footballers from Pontypridd
Association football midfielders
Premier League players
Luton Town F.C. players
Wimbledon F.C. players
Portsmouth F.C. players
Cardiff City F.C. players
Wales international footballers